Clay Jones may refer to:

Clay Jones (horticulturist) (1923-1996), British horticulturist and broadcaster
Clay Jones (cartoonist) (born 1966), American editorial cartoonist

See also
Clayton Jones (disambiguation)